Jiang Rensheng is a Chinese billionaire businessman, and the chairman of Zhifei, a vaccine manufacturer.
As of September 2021, Forbes estimated his net worth at US$21 billion.

Career
Jiang started work as a primary school teacher, and was then a government health official, before starting his own company.

In June 2020, Chongqing Zhifei Biological Products Co. shares had risen by 80% due to the approved clinical human testing of a COVID-19 vaccine. According to the Bloomberg Billionaires Index, the gains have increased Jiang Rensheng's fortune to $19.4 billion, placing him on the verge of joining the elite club of China's 10 wealthiest individuals.

Personal life
Jiang is married, with one child, and lives in Chongqing, China.

References

Chinese billionaires
Living people
1950s births
Chinese company founders